The 2017–18 Stade Malherbe Caen season was the 105th season of the club since its creation in 1913, the 17th in Ligue 1.

Players

Current squad

Out on loan

Competitions

Ligue 1

League table

Results summary

Results by round

Matches

Coupe de France

Coupe de la Ligue

Goalscorers

References

Caen
2017